Pleasant Grove is an unincorporated community in Panola County, Mississippi.

The Pleasant Grove Methodist Church and Pleasant Grove Cemetery are located there. The Pleasant Grove Volunteer Fire Department services the community. The Pleasant Grove School has been demolished.

Notable people
 Wyatt Emory Cooper, author and screenwriter; husband of Gloria Vanderbilt and father of Anderson Cooper.
 Big Daddy Kinsey, musician.
 Willie Mitchell, professional baseball player.

References

Unincorporated communities in Panola County, Mississippi
Unincorporated communities in Mississippi